was a Japanese journalist and culinary critic, best known for her role as a guest judge on Iron Chef Japan.

Career
Kishi was raised in Tokyo, and attended Kagawa Nutrition University. She began her writing career when she joined the Japanese monthly women's magazine Shufu no Tomo in 1955. She later worked for the publishing department of her alma mater and served ten years as editor-in-chief of the magazine Eiyō to Ryori (栄養と料理, Nutrition and Cooking) from 1968 to 1978.

In 1979, she created a publishing company specializing in magazines and books on cooking and nutrition. She published Sushi: A Light and Right Diet in 1986.

From 1993 to 1999, she appeared regularly as one of the judges on the original Iron Chef television program on Fuji Television.

Kishi died in Tokyo of heart failure on September 22, 2015, aged 91.

References

External links 
  
 Interview 

2015 deaths
1923 births
Writers from Tokyo

Food writers
Japanese journalists
Japanese magazine editors